USS Monaghan may refer to the following ships of the United States Navy:

, was a modified  launched in 1911 and served in World War I then served in the United States Coast Guard from 1924 to 1930
, was a  launched in 1935 and sunk during a typhoon in December 1944

United States Navy ship names